Syngenor (also known as Scared To Death 2) is a 1990 B horror/science fiction film and a sequel to the 1980 film Scared to Death. The film was directed by George Elanjian Jr and written by Michael Carmody and Brent V. Friedman. It features David Gale and Kathryn Noble.

Synopsis
Norton Cyberdyne provides high-tech military technology and their latest super weapon is "Syngenor" (SYNthesized GENetic ORganism). A prototype breaks loose and starts leaving a trail of bodies. As bodies pile up other Syngenors emerge from the basement and a battle rages between the monsters and the corporate humans.

Production
Producer Jack F. Murphy saw the original Scared to Death and was so impressed with the monster that he wanted to make another film utilizing the same monster design. However, since the first film was so low-budget and rarely seen he wanted to distance this sequel from it in order not to alienate a new potential audience that never heard of the first film. This is why there is no character or plot carry-over from Scared to Death other than the monster. Scared to Death director William Malone was asked and was originally going to direct this sequel. Malone ended up passing on the project as he had an opportunity to direct Creature, however he participated in creating the film's monster costumes.

Releases
Elite Entertainment and Synapse Films both released the film on Region 0 NTSC DVD.

Prism Leisure Corporation released the film on a double sided PAL DVD, the other side showing Progeny.

References

External links 
 
 
 Syngenor at BadMovies.org
 Syngenor at eccentric-cinema.com
 Syngenor at Somethingawful.com

1990 horror films
1990 films
1990s science fiction horror films
American science fiction horror films
1990s English-language films
1990s American films